Miss World 1974, the 24th edition of the Miss World pageant, was held on 22 November 1974 at the Royal Albert Hall in London, United Kingdom. The event was viewed by an estimated 30 million people, and was a "Wide World Special" on the ABC Television Network.

Helen Morgan of the United Kingdom was crowned the winner at the end of the event by Mrs. Julia Morley, becoming the second Welsh and fourth woman from the United Kingdom to win the title. Although it was known to the organizers at the time that she had a child as a single mother when she has crowned Miss Wales, due to intense pressure and media interest Morgan resigned four days later. The wife of the child's father had given many media interviews in the hours following the contest, creating extremely negative and lurid headlines. Morgan was the first Miss World titleholder to officially resign, and the second not to finish her reign as Miss World, after Marjorie Wallace in 1973.

Morgan had represented Wales in Miss Universe 1974 pageant earlier that year and placed first runner-up to eventual winner Amparo Muñoz of Spain. When Muñoz relinquished her Miss Universe title later that year, Morgan had already been outed as a mother and, therefore, ineligible to succeed Muñoz as Miss Universe. Muñoz was not replaced by any of the other runners-up.

Anneline Kriel of South Africa was crowned the new Miss World after Morgan's resignation. This is the Second time that South Africa had won the title of Miss World.

Results

Placements

Contestants

  – Evelyn Peggy Williams
  – Sara Barberi
  – Esther Angeli Luisa Marugg
  – Gail Margaret Petith
   – Eveline Engleder
  – Monique Betty Cooper
  – Linda Yvonne Field
  – Anne-Marie Sophie Sikorski
  – Joyce Ann de Rosa
  – Rosemary Moleti
  – Mariza Sommer
  – Sandra Margaret Emily Campbell
  – Luz María Osorio Fernández
  – Rose Marie Leprade Coto
  – Jane Moller
  – Giselle Scanlon Grullón
  – Silvia Aurora Jurado Estrada
  – Merja Talvikki Ekman
  – Edna Tepava
  – Sabrina Erlmeier
  – Patricia Orfila
  – Evgenia Dafni
  – Rosemary Pablo Laguna
  – Gina Elizabeth Ann Atkinson
  – Gerarda Sophia Balm
  – Leslie Suez Ramírez
  – Judy Denise Anita Dirkin
  – Kiran Dholakia
  – Julie Ann Farnham
  – Lea Klain
  – Zaira Zoccheddu
  – Andrea Lyon
  – Chikako Shima
  – Christine Marjorie Sangan
  – Shim Kyoung-sook
  – Gisèle Hachem
  – Raobelina Harisoa
  – Shirley Tan
  – Mary Louis Elull
  – Guadalupe del Carmen Elorriaga Valdés
  – Sue Nicholson
  – Francis Duarte de León Tapia
  – Torill Mariann Larsen
  – Agnes Benisano Rustia
  – Loyda Eunice Valle Blas Machado
  – Valerie Oh Choon Lian
  – Anneline Kriel
  – Natividad Rodríguez Fuentes
  – Vinodini Roshanara Jayskera
  – Jill Lindqvist
  – Astrid Maria Angst
  – Orn-Jir Chaisatra
  – Zohra Kehlifi
  – Helen Elizabeth Morgan 
  – Terry Ann Browning
  – Alicia Rivas Serrano
  – Jadranka Banjac
  – Christine Munkombwe

Notes

Debuts

Returns

Last competed in 1961:
 
Last competed in 1970:
 
Last competed in 1971:
 
 
Last competed in 1972:

References

External links
 Pageantopolis – Miss World 1974

Miss World
1974 in London
1974 beauty pageants
Beauty pageants in the United Kingdom
Events at the Royal Albert Hall
November 1974 events in the United Kingdom